Tércio Nunes Machado (born 9 January 1978 in Coromandel, Minas Gerais, Brazil) is a Brazilian association football player who is currently playing for Kanbawza FC.

Club career
As a midfielder, Tércio Nunes Machado played for several clubs including Atlético Mineiro, Caxias, Cruzeiro, Náutico and Ceilândia in Brazil before heading overseas.

He had a season with KL Plus FC in Malaysia before played for Feirense in Portugal and for Araxá in Brazil.

In December 2011, he returned to Malaysia and signed with Malaysia Super League side Terengganu FA, which will play in the 2012 AFC Cup. However, he later failed to register in the league after failing meeting the Football Association of Malaysia rules and requirements.

He left Malaysia and joined the Myanmar side, Kanbawza FC.

References

1978 births
Living people
Brazilian footballers
Brazilian expatriate footballers
Expatriate footballers in Malaysia
Sportspeople from Minas Gerais
Brazilian expatriate sportspeople in Myanmar
Brazilian expatriate sportspeople in Malaysia
Association football midfielders